Sidharth TV is an Odia language General Entertainment Channel in Odisha, India, which was launched on 15 May 2021 along with 2 other channels - Sidharth Gold & Sidharth Bhakti. The fourth channel of this group is "JAY JAGANNATH TV" which has been launched in May 2022. , owned by the parent company - Sidharth TV Network.

The chairman of the company is Sitaram Agrawal, who has been involved in the Odia Media Industry since the last 4 decades. In 2010 he founded Sarthak TV which he sold to Zee TV group in 2015, now it is Zee Sarthak. He is also founder of Sarthak Music & Sidharth Television Network.Sidharth TV is the flagship channel of the group ‘Sidharth TV Network’.

About Group
Sidharth TV Network is the parent company which operates Sidharth TV, Sidharth Bhakti and Sidharth Gold, all of which are premium subscription based channels.
 Sidharth TV is the flagship channel of the company, which is a premium GEC Channel featuring content such as Daily Soaps, and Reality shows, as well as wide range of popular content such as odia movies and jatras.
Sidharth Bhakti is the devotional channel of the company, which features a wide range of devotional content like spiritual discourses, folk and religious content like Pala, Daskathia, Astrological,Discourses, as well as Devotional music.
Sidharth Gold is a channel that features Movies, Music, and Jatra, featuring a wide variety of Musical and Entertaining shows
Jay Jagannath is a channel completely dedicated to Lord Jagannath, featuring live darshan from Jagannath Puri and spiritual shows on Lord Jagannath & which is 1st ad free television channel of Odisha.
Also a FM station at Bhubaneswar/Cuttack twin city in the name of 91.9 Sidharth FM Started in the year 2017.

Currently broadcasts

Fiction

Soap operas

Dubbed show

Non-fiction

Reality shows

Formerly broadcasts

Fiction

Soap operas

Non-fiction

Reality shows

Game shows

Programming

Fiction

Mega soaps

Non-fiction

Reality shows

Game shows

Music programs

Spiritual programs

Jatra

Movies

Channels

See also
List of Odia-language television channels
List of longest-running Indian television series

References

External links

Television stations in Odisha
Television stations in Bhubaneswar
Odia-language television channels
Companies based in Bhubaneswar
Television channels and stations established in 2021
2021 establishments in Odisha